McCain Mall is shopping mall located in North Little Rock, Arkansas, and is the largest mall in the Little Rock Metro and third largest enclosed mall in Arkansas. The mall is anchored by Dillard's, JCPenney, and Regal Cinemas.

History 
McCain Mall was developed on a 53.3 acre site on McCain Boulevard and Interstate 40 as Arkansas's largest mall.  The mall was officially dedicated in April 1973, although its primary anchor, Little Rock-based Pfeifer-Blass (now Dillard's), had opened for business in late 1972. Among its 96 stores and services were a J.G. McCrory 5 and 10 and McCain Mall Cinema I and II.

Over its 30+ year history, McCain Mall has never been expanded, although renovations were done in 1992 and again in 2011–2012. The former location of M. M. Cohn was demolished in 2012 for a Regal Entertainment Group movie theater.

In 2015, Sears Holdings spun off its 235 properties, including the Sears at McCain Mall, into Seritage Growth Properties. The auto center closed in 2017, and a portion of it became LongHorn Steakhouse on January 22, 2019. On November 7, 2019, it was announced that Sears would be closing this location a part of a plan to close 96 stores nationwide. The store closed on February 2, 2020.

External links
Official website

References

1973 establishments in Arkansas
Shopping malls established in 1973
Shopping malls in Arkansas
Buildings and structures in North Little Rock, Arkansas
Tourist attractions in North Little Rock, Arkansas

Shopping centers in the Little Rock Metro